South African Security Police may refer to:

 Security Branch, also called Special Branch, a unit of the South African Police during Apartheid
 South African Bureau of State Security, a state security agency from 1966–1980
 South African Police, apartheid-era police force
 South African Police Service, post-apartheid police force